is a Japanese former water polo player who competed in the 1972 Summer Olympics.

References

1950 births
Living people
Japanese male water polo players
Olympic water polo players of Japan
Water polo players at the 1972 Summer Olympics
Asian Games medalists in water polo
Water polo players at the 1970 Asian Games
Asian Games gold medalists for Japan
Medalists at the 1970 Asian Games
20th-century Japanese people
21st-century Japanese people